Goebel Franklin "Tex" Ritter (February 26, 1924 – October 15, 2004) was an American professional basketball player. Ritter was selected in the 1948 BAA Draft by the New York Knicks after a collegiate career at Eastern Kentucky. He played for the Knicks for three seasons before retiring from basketball.

BAA/NBA career statistics

Regular season

Playoffs

References

External links

 Ritter's obituary
 EKU's Hall of Fame entry

1924 births
2004 deaths
American men's basketball players
Basketball players from Kentucky
Battle of Iwo Jima
Eastern Kentucky Colonels baseball players
Eastern Kentucky Colonels football players
Eastern Kentucky Colonels golfers
Eastern Kentucky Colonels men's basketball players
Forwards (basketball)
Guards (basketball)
High school basketball coaches in the United States
New York Knicks draft picks
New York Knicks players
People from Richmond, Kentucky
United States Marine Corps personnel of World War II
United States Marines